Chapaguri Assembly constituency is one of the 126 assembly constituencies of Assam Legislative Assembly. Chapaguri forms part of the Kokrajhar Lok Sabha constituency.  It is a reserved seat for the Scheduled tribes (ST).

Town Details

Following are details on Chapaguri Assembly constituency-

Country: India.
 State: Assam.
 District: Baksa district .
 Lok Sabha Constituency: Kokrajhar Lok Sabha/Parliamentary constituency.
 Assembly Categorisation: Rural constituency.
 Literacy Level:70.53%.
 Eligible Electors as per 2021 General Elections: 1,59,257 Eligible Electors. Male Electors:79,384   . Female Electors: 79,873.
 Geographic Co-Ordinates:  26°43'33.6"N 91°12'10.4"E..
 Total Area Covered:262 square kilometres.
 Area Includes: Chapaguri and Kaklabari mouzas and Reserved forest in Patacharkuchi thana in Barpeta subdivision; and Uttar Baska and Dakhin Baska mouzas in Barama thana in Nalbari sub-division, of Baksa district of Assam.
 Inter State Border :Baksa.
 Number Of Polling Stations: Year 2011-184,Year 2016-185,Year 2021-63.

Members of Legislative Assembly

Following is the list of past members representing Chabua Assembly constituency in Assam Legislature.

 1978: Manik Chandra Das, Independent.
 1983: Bimal Gayari, Plain Tribals Council of Assam.
 1985: Suren Swargiary, Independent.
 1991: Suren Swargiary, Asom Gana Parishad.
 1996: Jagmohan Basmatary, Independent.
 2001: Tijen Basumatary, Independent.
 2006: Thaneswar Basumatary, Independent.
 2011: Hitesh Basumatary, Bodoland People's Front.
 2016: Thaneswar Basumatary, Bodoland People's Front.
 2021: Urkhao Gwra Brahma, United People's Party Liberal.

Election results

2021 result

2016 result

References

External links 
 

Assembly constituencies of Assam
Baksa district